Hakata Port Tower is a 103 metre high lattice tower with an observation deck in a height of 73.5 metres in Hakata-ku, Fukuoka, Japan. Hakata Port Tower was built in 1964.

External links

 http://www.thejapanfaq.com/fukpic/porttower.html
 http://kyushu.com/fukuoka/places_to_go/hak_port_tower/ 

Buildings and structures in Fukuoka
Tourist attractions in Fukuoka
Observation towers in Japan
Towers completed in 1964
1964 establishments in Japan